Antes is a Germanic surname. Notable people with this name include the following:

Surname
 Henry Antes (1701-1755), Bavarian religious/political leader
 Hilda Antes (1929 – 2016), German sprinter
 Horst Antes (born 1936), German sculptor
 John Antes (1740–1811), American composer
Lissette Antes, birthname Lissette Alexandra Antes Castillo (born 1991), Ecuadorian wrestler

Middle name
John Antes Latrobe (1799–1878), English cleric and writer

See also

Andes (disambiguation)
Antas (disambiguation)
Ante (name)
Antes (disambiguation)
Antis (disambiguation)
Antos (name)
Ants (given name)

Notes

German-language surnames